Maxim D. Shrayer (born June 5, 1967, Moscow, USSR) is a bilingual Russian-American author, translator, and literary scholar, and a professor of Russian, English, and Jewish Studies at Boston College.

Biography
Shrayer was born and grew up in Moscow, USSR, in the family of the writer David Shrayer-Petrov, and the translator Emilia Shrayer. Together with his parents he spent almost nine years as a refusenik before immigrating to the US in the summer of 1987. Shrayer attended Moscow University, Brown University (BA 1989), Rutgers University (MA 1990), and Yale University (Ph.D. 1995). Since 1996 he has been teaching at Boston College, where he is presently a professor of Russian, English, and Jewish Studies and co-founded the Jewish Studies Program. Shrayer founded and moderates the Michael B. Kreps Readings (Крепсовские Чтения) in Russian Émigré Literature at Boston College. In 2017-2021 Shrayer directed the Project on Russian & Eurasian Jewry at Harvard's Davis Center. Shrayer lives in Brookline and South Chatham, Mass. with his wife Dr. Karen E. Lasser, a medical doctor and researcher, and their two daughters. Shrayer's younger daughter, Tatiana Rebecca Shrayer, won second prize in the 2019 Stone Soup book context, resulting in the publication of her poetry collection Searching for Bow and Arrows.

Critical/biographical writing and literary translations

Shrayer has authored, co-authored, edited, or co-edited more than twenty books in English and Russian. He has translated into English poetry and prose by over forty authors, many of them Jewish-Russian writers, including four books of fiction by his father, David Shrayer-Petrov, which he edited and cotranslated: Jonah and Sarah, Autumn in Yalta, Dinner with Stalin, and Doctor Levitin.

A scholar of Vladimir Nabokov, Ivan Bunin, Jewish-Russian literature, Russian Jewry, and Soviet literature, and a cultural historian of the Shoah, Shrayer has published extensively on émigré culture and various aspects of multilingual and multicultural identities in 19th and 20th century literature.

His book "Russian Poet-Soviet Jew" (2000) was the first study focused on Jewish literary identity in the early Soviet decades. With his father, David Shrayer-Petrov, Shrayer coauthored the first book about the avant-garde poet Genrikh Sapgir. Shrayer's Russian-language study, Bunin i Nabokov: Istoriia sopernichestva (Bunin and Nabokov. A History of Rivalry) has been a best-seller in Russia and has gone through three editions.

For the two-volume Anthology of Jewish-Russian Literature: Two Centuries of a Dual Identity in Prose and Poetry, 1801-2001, which showcases over 130 authors, Shrayer received the National Jewish Book Award in the Eastern European Studies category in 2007. In 2018 he published another anthology, Voices of Jewish-Russian Literature, to feature over 80 authors.

In 2012 Shrayer was awarded a Guggenheim Fellowship for his research on Jewish poets and witnesses to the Shoah—a topic he investigated in his book I SAW IT: Ilya Selvinsky and the Legacy of Bearing Witness to the Shoah (2013) and in recent articles.

His book With or Without it: The Prospect for Russia's Jews, examines Russia's dwindling yet still vibrant Jewish community.

Literary career
Unlike most representatives of the so-called "new wave" of Russian-American writing, Maxim D. Shrayer had written and published poetry and prose extensively in his native Russian prior to having made a transition to writing prose predominantly in English. He continues to write verse and literary prose in both languages and to co-author translations of his English-language works into Russian. His career has been described as one of a "translingual" writer.
 
Shrayer began to write poetry and prose in his native Russian at the age of eighteen and subsequently contributed it to Russian-language magazine abroad and in the former USSR. His Russian-language poetry has been gathered in four collections. At Brown University Shrayer majored in comparative literature and literary translation and studied fiction writing with John Hawkes. Around 1995, the year when he received a Ph.D. in Russian literature from Yale University, Shrayer switched to creative prose mainly in English. His stories, essays and memoirs, have since appeared in American, Canadian, and British magazines, among them Agni, Kenyon Review, Southwest Review, and Tablet Magazine. Shrayer's works have been translated into Russian, Japanese, German, French, Croatian, Italian, Chinese, Slovak and other languages. Shrayer quickly transitioned to writing prose in English, but it took him over thirty years to write his first book of poetry in English.

Shrayer's literary memoir "Waiting for America: A Story of Emigration" appeared in 2007 as the first literary book in the English language to capture the experience of Soviet Jewish emigres and former refuseniks waiting in Italy en route to the New World. Of Waiting for America Sam Coale wrote in The Providence Journal that "[t]he glory of this book lies in Shrayer's sinuous, neo-Proustian prose, beautifully fluid and perceptive with its luminous shocks of recognition, landscapes, descriptions and asides…Tales and teller mesmerize and delight." Shrayer's Leaving Russia: A Jewish Story, chronologically a prequel to Waiting for America, came out in 2013 and was a finalist of the National Jewish Book Awards. It depicts the experience of growing up Jewish in the Soviet Union and the struggle of refuseniks for emigration. Annette Gendler wrote in Jewish Book World that "Maxim D. Shrayer's stunning memoir … is an engaging story of growing up as the son of Jewish intellectuals in Moscow who applied for emigration when he was ten to give him a future as a Jew. … Leaving Russia should be assigned reading for anyone interested in the Jewish experience of the twentieth century."

Shrayer's collection of stories Yom Kippur in Amsterdam, was published in 2009. Of Yom Kippur in Amsterdam Leah Strauss wrote in Booklist: "This intricate, thoughtful collection explores the inexorable complexities of relationships and religion…Shrayer's eight delicate stories trace his characters' diverse struggles against the limits of tradition and culture."

Shrayer's literary exploration of the lives of Russian immigrants continued with his book A Russian Immigrant: Three Novellas. With A Russian Immigrant, Shrayer reaffirms his commitment to writing about the lives of Russian (Soviet) Jews abroad. In the words of Debra Lawless, "Shrayer poses many profound questions about what it means to be an immigrant carrying 'the baggage of memory' in his new book A Russian Immigrant: Three Novellas."

In 2020 Shrayer, initially in response to the election-year politics, and later to COVID-19, Shrayer wrote a series of poems in English, which appeared as a book, Of Politics and Pandemics: Songs of a Russian Immigrant. The voice of the book stems in part from the voice of Shrayer's A Russian Immigrant: Three Novellas. Critic and Reed College Professor Marat Grinberg wrote of Shrayer's poetry collection: "'A Russian Immigrant' writing in English because it is 'a survival instinct,' since his 'audience is here,' both offers his American readers a rich lesson in Russian poetry and reminds them that traditional form does not preclude inventiveness and boldness of opinions."

Books 
Nonfiction and fiction in English:
A Russian Immigrant: Three Novellas. Boston: Cherry Orchard Books, 2019.
Soviet Phantoms Vacation in Chile. A Family Chronicle [eBook]. Brookline: Ladispoli Books, 2019.
With or Without You: The Prospect for Jews in Today's Russia. Boston: Academic Studies Press, 2017.
Leaving Russia: A Jewish Story. Syracuse: Syracuse University Press, 2013. Russian translation Бегство: Документальный роман (Moscow: Tri kvadrata, 2019). Italian translation Fuga dalla Russia. Una storia ebraica (Pisa: Pisa University Press, 2020).
Yom Kippur in Amsterdam: Stories. Syracuse: Syracuse University Press, 2009. Expanded Russian translation Исчезновение Залмана (Moscow: Knizhniki, 2017).
Waiting for America: A Story of Emigration. Syracuse: Syracuse University Press, 2007. Russian translation "В ожидании Америки: Документальный роман" (Moscow: Al'pina Non-fikshn, 2013; 2nd ed. 2016; 3rd ed. 2021). Italian translation Aspettando America (Pisa: Pisa University Press, 2017).

Poetry in English:
Of Politics and Pandemics: Songs of a Russian Immigrant. Boston: M-Graphics Publishing, 2020.

Poetry in Russian:
Стихи из айпада (Poems from the iPad). Tel Aviv: Babel Bookstore and Publishing, 2022.
Американский романс (American Romance). Moscow: Russlit, 1994.
Ньюхейвенские сонеты (New Haven Sonnets). Providence, RI: APKA Publishers, 1998.
Табун над лугом (A Herd above the Meadow). New York: Gnosis Press, 1990.

Selected books of criticism and biography:
Антисемитизм и упадок русской деревенской школы: Астафьев, Белов, Распутин (Antisemitism and the Decline of Russian Village Prose: Astafiev, Belov, Rasputin). St. Petersburg: Academic Studies Press/BiblioRosica, 2020.
Бунин и Набоков: История соперничества (Bunin and Nabokov. A History of Rivalry). Moscow: Alpina Non-fikshn, 2014; 2nd. ed. 2015; 3rd, expanded ed. 2019 [in Russian]. Slovak translation, 2016; Chinese translation, 2016.
I SAW IT: Ilya Selvinsky and the Legacy of Bearing Witness to the Shoah. Boston: Academic Studies Press, 2013.
Genrikh Sapgir: Avant-garde Classic (with David Shrayer-Petrov). St. Petersburg: Dmitrij Bulanin, 2004 [in Russian]. 2nd., corrected edition St. Petersburg: Bibliorossica, 2016. 3rd, corrected edition. Ekaterinburg: Izdatel'skie resheniia; Ridero, 2017.
 Nabokov: Themes and Variations. St. Petersburg: Academic Project, 2000 [in Russian].
Russian Poet/Soviet Jew: The Legacy of Eduard Bagritskii. Lanham, MA and London: Rowman & Littlefield, 2000.
The World of Nabokov's Stories. Austin, TX: University of Texas Press, 1998.

Anthologies:
 An Anthology of Jewish-Russian Literature: Two Centuries of Dual Identity in Prose and Poetry, 1801-2001. 2 vols. Armonk, NY: M. E. Sharpe, 2007.
Voices of Jewish-Russian Literature. An Anthology. Boston: Academic Studies Press, 2018.

Edited volumes:
The Parallel Universes of David Shrayer-Petrov. A Collection Published on the Occasion of the Writer's 85th Birthday. Edited by Roman Katsman, Maxim D. Shrayer, Klavdia Smola. Boston: Academic Studies Press, 2021.
Parallel'nye vselennye Davida Shraera-Petrova. Sbornik statei i materialov k 85-letiiu pisatelia. Edited by Roman Katsman, Maxim D. Shrayer, Klavdia Smola. St. Petersbug: Academic Studies Press/Bibliorossica, 2021.

Further reading 
Victoria Aarons. Jewish in America. In: The New Jewish American Literary Studies. Ed. Victoria Aarons. Cambridge: Cambridge University Press, 2019. 33–43.
Anna Barilovskaia, Natal’ia Kolesova. “Vzaimodeistie kul’tur v translingval’nykh tekstakh M. Shraera.” Kazanskaia nauka 12 (2018): 101–104.
Eva Borovitskaia. “Semanticheskoe pole ‘emigrant’ v proizvedenii M.D. Shraera ‘V ozhidanii Ameriki.’” In: Izomorfnye i allomorfnye priznaki iazykovykh system. Sbornik statei. Stavropol: Paragraf, 2018. 107-115.
Evgeny Belodubrovsky. Bedeker i baiki. Nezavisimaia gazeta ExLibris 19 September 2013.
Mary Besemeres. Travels through Russian in English: Dale Pesmen, Maria Tumarkin, Maxim Shrayer and Gary Shteyngart.” Flusser Studies 22 (2016): 1–17.
Dmitry Bobyshev. Shraer, Maksim. In: Slovar' poetov husskogo zarubezh'ia. Ed. Vadim Kreyd  et al. St. Petersburg, 1999. 431–432.
Jonathan Brickman. Waiting for America: Russian Refugee Adventures in Italy. Newton Magazine (December 2007); Brookline Magazine (December 2007).
Rita Filanti. Migration as Translation: Maxim D. Shrayer's Waiting for America and Trespassing Linguistic Checkpoints.” In: L’intraduisible: Les méandres de la traduction. Ed. Sabrina Baldo de Brébisson et Stephanie Genty Études linguistiques. Paris: Artois Presses Université, 2018. 319–334.
Julian Fürst. The Difficult Process of Leaving a Place of Non-Belonging: Maxim D. Shrayer's Memoir, Leaving Russia: A Jewish Story,” Journal of Jewish Identities 8.2 (July 2015): 189–208.
Stefano Garzonio. Il fiero istante. Una cronaca degli addii. In: Maxim D. Shrayer, Aspettando America: Stories di una migrazione. Tr. by Rita Filanti, ed. and afterword Stefano Garzonio. Pisa: University of Pisa Press, 2017. 210–209.
Bruno B. Gomide. Maxim D. Shrayer. I SAW IT. Cadernos de língua e literatura Hebraica 12 (2015).
Marat Grinberg. ‘My Judaic Pride Sang’: Eduard Bagritsky and the Making of SovietJewish Identity. East European Jewish Affairs 32.2 (Winter 2002): 108–113.
Helena Gurfinkel. Men of the World: Diasporic Masculinities in Transit(ion) in Maxim D. Shrayer's Waiting for America: A Story of Emigration. Culture, Society, and Masculinity 1.2 (2009): 197–212.
Katharine Hodgson. Mirror of the Abyss. Times Literary Supplement 18 April 2014: 25.
Felix Philipp Ingold. Iwan Bunin und Vladimir Nabokov. Geschichte einer Rivalität. Neue Zürcher Zeitung 22 May 2015.
Linda Matchan. American Productivity. The Boston Globe (15 April 2008): E1; 6.
Nika Nalyota. Vse vperedi. Novosti literatury 24 June 2013.
Monica Osborne. The Future of Jewish Life in Russia. Jewish Journal 9–15 March 2018: 38.
Valentina Parisi. Maxim Shrayer, un’estate a “Ladispol” tra Mosca e l’America. by Valentina Parsi. Alfabeta 2 (29 July 2018).
Michele Russo. Nemo profeto in patria: Linguistic and Cultural Patterns in Maxim D. Shrayer's Waiting for America: A Story of Emigration and A Russian Immigrant: Three Novellas. In: Oltreoceano. Erranze tra mito e storia. Ed. Silvana Serafin and Alessandra Ferraro. Padova: Linea Edizioni, 2021. 117–128.
Penny Schwartz, Son of Refuseniks Chronicles the Slow Dissolve of Russia's Jews. Jewish Telegraph Agency 16 January 2018. 
Liu Wenxia. Russian-American Writers: The New Generation of American Jewish Literature" (in Chinese). New Perspectives on World Literature 3 (2014): 55–58.

Selected interviews 
 "Growing Up Refusenik: A Q&A with Maxim D. Shrayer on his new memoir" Lea Zeltserman. Words on the Soviet-Jewish Immigration 12 December 2013
"Interview with author Maxim D. Shrayer" Boston Bibliophile 26 May 2010
"Pisat' po-angliiski ili po-russki, eto i sud'ba, i vybor" ("To write in Russian or in English is both a choice and a destiny") Runyweb 29 July 2011
 Maxim D. Shrayer in the Encyclopedia of Russian America 2011

Selected news features 
 "Son of Refuseniks Chronicles the Slow Dissolve of Russia's Jews" Jewish Telegraphic Agency 16 January 2018
 "American Productivity, The Boston Globe April 2008
"Tales of a Totalitarian State: Newton Author Helps Chronicle Soviet Union Life" The Boston Globe 6 August 2006
"Destiny:  A Poet Writes in His Father's Words" Boston College Magazine Fall 2003
 "In Other Words: The Translator's Double Life" Boston College Magazine Spring 2002

References

External links 
Shrayer's official site
 Shrayer's Boston College site
 Shrayer's author page on Amazon.com

1967 births
20th-century Russian male writers
20th-century American translators
American literary critics
20th-century American memoirists
American people of Russian-Jewish descent
American short story writers
American writers of Russian descent
Boston College faculty
Brown University alumni
English–Russian translators
Jewish American writers
Jewish refugees
Living people
Russian emigrants to the United States
Russian male poets
Russian male short story writers
Russian refugees
Russian translators
Soviet Jews
Translators from English
Translators from Russian
Soviet emigrants to the United States
21st-century American Jews